This is a list of members of the South Australian Legislative Council between 2006 and 2010, spanning the 50th (elected in 2002) and 51st (elected in 2006) Parliament of South Australia. As half of the Legislative Council's terms expired at each state election, half of these members were elected at the 2002 state election with terms expiring in 2010, while the other half were elected at the 2006 state election with terms expiring in 2014.

 Labor MLC Terry Roberts died on 18 February 2006. Labor candidate Bernard Finnigan was appointed for the remaining four years of Redford's term on 2 May 2006.
 Liberal MLC Angus Redford resigned from the Legislative Council in March 2006 in an unsuccessful attempt to shift to the House of Assembly. Liberal candidate Stephen Wade was appointed for the remaining four years of Redford's term on 2 May 2006.
 Independent MLC Nick Xenophon resigned on 15 October 2007 in order to run for the Australian Senate at the 2007 federal election. Xenophon's second running mate, John Darley, was appointed to the casual vacancy on 21 November 2007.
 Family First MLC Andrew Evans resigned on 3 July 2008. Robert Brokenshire, a former Liberal MHA, was appointed as Evans' replacement on 24 July 2008.
 Democrats MLC Sandra Kanck resigned on 7 November 2008. David Winderlich was appointed as Kanck's replacement on 17 February 2009.
 Democrats MLC David Winderlich resigned from the party on 7 October 2009 and served out his term as an independent.

Members of South Australian parliaments by term
21st-century Australian politicians